"Leave a Little Love" is a song by Swedish DJ and producer Alesso and Dutch DJ Armin van Buuren. It was released on 25 February 2021 via Kontor Records and Universal. It also marks the first collaboration for them on an original song.

Critical reception
Ellie Mullins of We Rave You commented the track: "the powerful and anthemic vocals drive the track in the right direction, acting as the cherry on top of the delicious-sounding cake."

Music video
The music video was released on 7 March 2021. According to a description by Rachel Narozniak of Dancing Astronaut, the video features with an animated and visual of "Mario Kart-esque", artists are stylized as race cars, and recorded they "rush to the finish line in nearly four minutes' time."

Other versions
On March 2021, van Buuren released the "Club Mix" version of the track. It has element of progressive trance.

Charts

Weekly charts

Year-end charts

Certifications

Release history

References

2021 songs
2021 singles
Alesso songs
Armin van Buuren songs
Songs written by Alesso
Songs written by Armin van Buuren
Kontor Records singles
Universal Music Group singles

Redirects from songs
Song recordings produced by Alesso